Ramazan Gadzhimuradovich Abdulatipov (born 4 August 1946) is a Russian politician and professor of Avar heritage. He served as Head of the Republic of Dagestan from 28 January 2013 until his resignation effective 3 October 2017.

Biography 
From 1990–1993 he was Chairman of the Council of Nationalities, a chamber of the Supreme Soviet of the Russian SFSR. In 1991 he was a candidate for Vice President of Russia. During the September–October crisis of 1993, he condemned president Yeltsin's decree dissolving the Congress of People's Deputies of Russia, and was one of the members of the Supreme Soviet delegation in talks with the pro-presidential side.

From May 2005 to 6 March 2009, Abdulatipov served as Ambassador of Russia to Tajikistan.

From 20 December 2018 - Special Representative of the Russian Federation to the Organization of Islamic Cooperation in Jeddah, Kingdom of Saudi Arabia.

Awards 
 Order of Friendship (1997)
 Order "For Merit to the Fatherland" (2016)
 Order of Alexander Nevsky (2017) 
 Order of Honour (Russia) (2011) 
 Order For Services to the Republic of Dagestan (2011)
 Dostlug Order (2016) 
 Medal "In Commemoration of the 850th Anniversary of Moscow"

Publications 
Author of numerous books and articles published mainly in Russian language.

Personal life
Abdulatipov is married to Inna Abdulatipova (née Kalinina). It was reported that in 2014, their income amounted to almost 3,9 million rubles. They owned three land plots, three country houses, and half of a 100-square-meters apartment. 

The Abdulatipovs have two sons and a daughter.

Abdulatipov has a brother, Rajab. From 2006 to 2016, he was the head of the migration service in the Republic of Dagestan. Since September 2016, Rajab Abdulatipov worked as a deputy of the People's Assembly of the Republic of Dagestan. Also, he was a chairman of the republican Committee of Education, Science and Culture. Rajab Abdulatipov was detained in September 2018 for collaborating with a criminal organization.

References

External links
 Ramazan Gadzhimuradovich Abdulatipov official personal website

1946 births
Living people
People from Tlyaratinsky District
Communist Party of the Soviet Union members
Party of Russian Unity and Accord politicians
United Russia politicians
21st-century Russian politicians
Members of the Supreme Soviet of Russia
Members of the Federation Council of Russia (1994–1996)
Members of the Federation Council of Russia (after 2000)
Ambassador Extraordinary and Plenipotentiary (Russian Federation)
Ambassadors of Russia to Tajikistan
Members of the Tajik Academy of Sciences
Recipients of the Order of Honour (Russia)
Honoured Scientists of the Russian Federation
Avar people
Russian people of Dagestani descent
Russian Sunni Muslims
Deputy heads of government of the Russian Federation
Abdulatipov
Recipients of the Order "For Merit to the Fatherland", 4th class
Second convocation members of the State Duma (Russian Federation)
Sixth convocation members of the State Duma (Russian Federation)